is a Japanese footballer currently playing as a defender for YSCC Yokohama of J3 League.

Career statistics

Club
.

Notes

References

External links

1996 births
Living people
Sportspeople from Kanagawa Prefecture
Association football people from Kanagawa Prefecture
Japanese footballers
Japanese expatriate footballers
Association football defenders
J3 League players
YSCC Yokohama players
União Suzano Atlético Clube players
Japanese expatriate sportspeople in Brazil
Expatriate footballers in Brazil